Staurotheca is a genus of cnidarians belonging to the monotypic family Staurothecidae.

The species of this genus are found in southernmost Southern Hemisphere.

Species

Species:

Staurotheca abyssalis 
Staurotheca affinis 
Staurotheca amphorophora

References

Leptothecata
Hydrozoan genera